Micropterix abchasiae is a species of moth belonging to the family Micropterigidae that was described by Aleksei Zagulyaev in 1983. It is only found in Abkhazia in Georgia.

References

Micropterigidae
Moths described in 1983
Endemic fauna of Georgia (country)
Moths of Asia
Taxa named by Aleksei Konstantinovich Zagulyaev